Homeland Security Committee can refer to:

 United States House Committee on Homeland Security
 United States Senate Committee on Homeland Security and Governmental Affairs